Spello (in Antiquity: Hispellum) is an ancient town and comune (township) of Italy, in the province of Perugia in eastern-central Umbria, on the lower southern flank of Mt. Subasio. It is 6 km (4 mi) NNW of Foligno and 10 km (6 mi) SSE of Assisi.

The old walled town lies on a regularly NW-SE sloping ridge that eventually meets the plain. From the top of the ridge, Spello commands a good view of the Umbrian plain towards Perugia; at the bottom of the ridge, the town spills out of its walls into a small modern section (or borgo) served by the rail line from Rome to Florence via Perugia.

History

Populated in ancient times by the Umbri, it became a Roman colony in the 1st century BC. Under the reign of Constantine the Great it was called Flavia Constans, as attested by a document preserved in the local Communal Palace.

Main sights

The densely inhabited town, built with stone, retains its medieval aspect; the town is enclosed in a circuit of medieval walls built on Roman foundations, including three Roman Late Antique gates (Porta Consolare, Porta di Venere and the "Arch of Augustus") and traces of three more. The town incorporated the remains of an amphitheater. 

Among the churches of interest in the town are:
Santa Maria Maggiore (known from 1159): The Church was probably built over an ancient temple dedicated to Juno and Vesta. The façade has a Romanesque portal and a 13th-century bell tower, while the pilasters next to the apse have frescoes by Perugino (1512) as well as the later Spello Pietà by the same artist. The most prominent artwork are the  Pinturicchio frescoes in the Baglioni Chapel. The Umbrian artist was called to paint it around 1500 by Troilo Baglioni, after he had just finished the Borgia Apartment's decoration. The cycle include an Annunciation, a Nativity and a Dispute with the Doctors, plus four Sibyls in the vault. 
Sant'Andrea (known from 1025). Church with  14th-century frescoes and an altarpiece by Pinturicchio.
San Lorenzo (12th century):  Church where San Bernardino da Siena began his sermons in 1438.
San Claudio (11th century or earlier), an elegant example of Romanesque architecture with a rose window on the asymmetrical façade. The interior has 14th century votive frescoes from the Umbrian school. It is said to have been built on the remains of a Paleo-Christian cemetery.
Tega Chapel (14th century), with Umbrian school 15th-century frescoes, including a Crucifixion attributed to Nicolò Alunno.

Other points of interest include:
Palazzo Comunale Vecchio ("Old Town Hall", built in 1270 and enlarged after the end of the Baglioni seigniory, in 1567–1575). It has some frescoed halls, one attributed to the Zuccari brothers. It is faced by a 16th-century fountain.
Palazzo dei Canonici - Priory annexed to the church of Santa Maria Maggiore, it now houses the Town's Art Gallery (Pinacoteca Civica). Among the artists featured are the Maestro dell'Assunta di Amelia, Cola Petruccioli, Zaccaria di Filippo Mazzola (brother of Parmigianino), Andrea d'Assisi also called Ingegno, and a Madonna and Child by Pinturicchio.
Palazzo Cruciali, built in the early 17th century.
Palazzo Baglioni, erected as a fortified mansion around 1359. The Governor's Hall has frescoes from the 16th century.
Arch of Augustus (1st century BC-1st century AD).

In the plain, near San Claudio, are the remains of a semi-excavated Roman amphitheater; and a small valley to the east of the town is remarkable for its traces of Roman centuriation.

Beyond the town proper, the comune'''s chief monuments are the church of San Silvestro at Collepino, and the church of the Madonna della Spella with late-medieval votive frescoes and graffiti.

Festivals
The Infiorate include a whole night of work to create over sixty flower carpets on the Corpus Domini feast.

Twin towns
 Alfonsine, Italy, since 1974

Since 2008 Spello has also a pact of friendship with Accadia, Italy.
 
External links

Official website
Bill Thayer's site (including Urbini's Spello, Bevagna, Montefalco'')
Creative Spello by Adalberto Tiburzi

The Infiorate
Spello's Infiorate
Official site
"Gruppo infioratori Acquatino"
Spello Infiorata

References

Hilltowns in Umbria
Roman sites of Umbria